Lyin', Cheatin', Woman Chasin', Honky Tonkin', Whiskey Drinkin' You is the thirty-sixth solo studio album by American country music singer-songwriter Loretta Lynn. It was released on May 30, 1983, by MCA Records.

This was Lynn's first album of her Decca/MCA career to fail to produce a single top 40 country hit, with both of the album's single releases only reaching the lower end of the top 100 country singles chart.

Commercial performance 
The album peaked at No. 60 on the Billboard Top Country Albums chart. The album's first single, "Lyin', Cheatin', Woman Chasin', Honky Tonkin', Whiskey Drinkin' You", peaked at No. 53 on the Billboard Hot Country Songs chart. The second single, "Walking with My Memories", peaked at No. 59.

Track listing

Personnel 
Adapted from album liner notes.

Harold Bradley – bass
Owen Bradley – producer
David Briggs – piano, keyboards
Kenneth Buttrey – drums
Jimmy Capps – guitar
Ron Chancey – producer
Eugene Chrisman – drums
Johnny Christopher – guitar
Ray Edenton – guitar
Sonny Garrish – steel guitar
Buddy Harman – drums
Mike Leech – bass
Grady Martin – guitar
Charlie McCoy – harmonica
Bob Moore – bass
Mark Morris – percussion
The Nashville String Machine – strings
Ron Oates – piano/keyboards
Joe Osborn – bass
Hargus "Pig" Robbins – piano, keyboards
Hal Rugg – steel guitar
Dale Sellers – guitar
Jerry Shook – guitar
Pete Wade – guitar
Bobby Wood – piano, keyboards
Reggie Young – electric guitar

Chart positions 
Album – Billboard (North America)

Singles – Billboard (North America)

References 

1983 albums
Loretta Lynn albums
Albums produced by Ron Chancey
Albums produced by Owen Bradley
MCA Records albums